Members of the New South Wales Legislative Council between 1946 and 1943 were indirectly elected by a joint sitting of the New South Wales Parliament, with 15 members elected every three years. The most recent election was in March 1946, with the term of new members commencing on 23 April 1946. The President was Ernest Farrar.

See also
Second McKell ministry
First McGirr ministry
Second McGirr ministry

References

Members of New South Wales parliaments by term
20th-century Australian politicians